Phtheochroa aarviki is a species of moth of the family Tortricidae. It is found in Kenya.

Larvae have been reared on the fruit of Bothriocline species.

References

Endemic moths of Kenya
Moths described in 2012
Phtheochroa